Events from the year 1552 in France

Incumbents
 Monarch – Henry II

Events
15 January – Signing of the Treaty of Chambord 
Cour des monnaies is established
October 1552 to January 1553 – Siege of Metz

Births

8 February – Agrippa d'Aubigné, poet, soldier, propagandist and chronicler (d. 1630)
23 October – Odet de Turnèbe, dramatist (d. 1581)

Full date missing
Jean Bertaut, poet (d. 1611)
Charles David, architect (d. 1650)
François Grudé, writer and bibliographer
Jean Hotman, Marquis de Villers-St-Paul, diplomat (d. 1636)
Antoine de Pluvinel, riding master (d. 1620)

Deaths

8 January – Eustorg de Beaulieu, poet, composer and pastor (b. around 1495)
1 February – Charles de Solier, comte de Morette, soldier and diplomat (b. 1480)
2 December – Claude d'Annebault, military officer (b. 1495)

Full date missing
Pierre du Chastel, humanist, librarian (born around 1480)
René I, Viscount of Rohan (b. 1516)

See also

References

1550s in France